Aileen Sibell Mary Plunket (née Guinness; 1904–1999) was an Anglo-Irish society hostess. She was one of the "Guinness Golden Girls" who were icons in the 1920s, along with her sisters Maureen and Oonagh.

Life
Plunket was one of three daughters of Ernest Guinness and Marie Clothilde Russell (1880–1953). She was part of the rich and well-connected Guinness family. As a girl she lived at Glenmaroon in Chapelizod near Dublin. Her father lavished money on his daughters but his primary interest was in his business.  

In 1923, she and her sisters were sent on a world tour in her father's high masted yacht, Fantome II. All three of the girls married well. Her sisters went to live at the mansions of Clandeboye and Luggalla. When she married Brinsley Sheridan Plunket, her father bought her Luttrellstown Castle near Dublin.

Over the next 50 years, Plunket redesigned the interiors of Luttrellstown Castle using the service of Felix Harbord. The castle and particularly the dining room still reflect their changes.

Plunket held large parties including an extensive bar.

Her husband was killed during the war just after they had divorced in 1940.

In 1956, she married the interior designer Valerian Stux-Rybar but this marriage lasted only until 1965. He was extravagant and Plunket's lifestyle had to be trimmed after her father died and death duties had to be paid. She sold the castle in 1983 and retired to residences at Elveden Hall and London. She died on 31 March 1999.

References 

1904 births
1999 deaths
Irish socialites
Guinness family